The Ashanti Empire was an Akan empire and kingdom from 1701 to 1957, in modern-day Ghana. The military of the Ashanti Empire first came into formation around the 17th century AD in response to subjugation by the Denkyira Kingdom. It served as the main armed forces of the empire until it was dissolved when the Ashanti became a British crown colony in 1901.
In 1701, King Osei Kofi Tutu I won Ashanti independence from Denkyira at the Battle of Feyiase and carried out an expansionist policy.

The Ashanti army prior to the 18th century used predominantly bows with poisoned arrows, swords, spears and javelins. King Osei Tutu I instituted reforms in the army such as the adoption of military tactics used by other Akan kingdoms. Through trade with Europeans at the coast, the Ashanti acquired firearms and artillery. By the 19th century, the army was primarily equipped with muskets and rifles. Transportation across water bodies was achieved through the use of canoes. The army was also accompanied by military engineers. Cavalry was not adopted alongside the Ashanti infantry. In order to mobilize personnel for the army, volunteers and contingents from tributaries were supplemented with a core of professional soldiers. The Ashanti developed various tactics such as encirclement and pincer movement.

History 
The Ashanti originally centered on clans which were headed by a paramount chief or Amanhene. The clans did not have a standing and organized army that operated on a centralized chain of command. The Ashanti clans became tributaries of another Akan state, Denkyira who exerted influence over much of the region. In the mid-17th century the Oyoko, an Ashanti clan led by Chief Nana Oti Akenten, is believed to have been the first to have achieved military unification among the clans.

War of Independence 
In the 1670s the head of the Oyoko clan and successor to Nana Akenten, Osei Kofi Tutu I, began another rapid consolidation of Akan clans. He sought cooperation via diplomacy and warfare. Osei Tutu I and his chief advisor, Okomfo Anokye led a coalition of Ashanti city-states against Denkyira. The coalition defeated Denkyira at the Battle of Feyiase in 1701 which marked the rise of the Ashanti state.

Reforms under Osei Tutu I 
Osei Tutu centralized the loose confederation of Akan states in order to organize and professionalize the military. He also expanded the powers of the Judiciary system within the Centralized government. Eventually, the loose confederation of small city-states unified as a kingdom and grew into an empire. Newly conquered areas had the option to either join the Ashanti Empire or become tributary states.

Osei Tutu placed strong emphasis on the military organization of the Akan Union states prior to the war with Denkyira. He adopted the military organization of Ashanti allies, Akwamu, and honed the Union army into an effective fighting unit.
Osei Tutu improved the battle strategy of the union army through the introduction of the pincer formation whereby soldiers attacked from the left, right and rear. This formation was later adopted by several other kingdoms in the Gold Coast.
The Ashanti military declined in 1901 after the empire was defeated by the British following the War of the Golden Stool.

Organization 

The Asantehene was the commander-in-chief of the Ashanti military. A war-tax was paid by all Ashanti citizens over the age of 18 to cover the expenses of warfare. The army of the Ashanti Empire was organized into 6 parts. Each had various sub divisions. The organization of the Ashanti army was based on local Akan military systems such as the organization of the Akwamu army. The six parts of the Ashanti army were:

 Scouts
 Advance guard
 Main body
 Personal bodyguard
 Rear-guard
 Two wings-left and right. Each wing having two formations: right and right-half, left and left-half

In battle, the army used advanced guard, main body, rear guard and right and left wings on the move. This organization enabled the Ashanti generals to maneuver their forces with flexibility. Reconnaissance and pursuit operations were carried out by the scouts. The scouts were made up of professional hunters who used their skill of marksmanship to snipe at advancing enemy forces in response to detection by the enemy. This was executed often from a perch high in trees. In order to draw the enemy's force and compel them to reveal their positions in the jungle foliage, the scouts carried long wooden sticks with hooks on the end which they used to shake trees as if someone were in them. Scouts were precluded from an involvement in prolonged fighting. After exchanging a few shots with the enemy, they withdrew through the  next wave of troops which was the advanced guards. The advanced guard could also serve as initial storm troops or bait troops to get the enemy to reveal their position and strength. The  or personal guards protected the king or high ranking nobles on the battlefield. The rear guard however, might function for pursuit or as a reserve echelon. The two wings aided in the tactics of the Ashanti during battle through the encirclement of the opposing force or striking at the rear.

Individualized acts of daring were encouraged, such as rushing out into the open to behead dead or wounded enemies. A tally of these trophies was presented to the commanding general after the end of the engagement. Soldiers who tried to flee from battle were kept in check by sword-bearers who whipped them with heavy swords. Ashanti soldiers had to memorize the following saying: "If I go forward, I die; if I flee, I die. Better to go forward and die in the mouth of battle."

The  or special police functioned as special forces and bodyguards to the Asantehene. They served as a source of intelligence for suppressing rebellion. Horses were introduced into the state around the 18th century. Horses were recorded to have survived in Kumasi in contrast to the forest zone in the south due to the presence of the tsetse fly. Edgerton writes that although Ashanti high ranking officers rode horses with the hauteur of European officers, a cavalry was not developed for the Ashanti military. Thornton adds that the Ashanti captured and rode horses after a campaign against states up north in the 18th century. This attempt at forming a cavalry was ineffective which Thornton puts up as; "...though they can be hardly an effective cavalry and reportedly all were killed in one engagement." Canoes were used for troop transport across rivers. British captain, Brackenbury described an amphibious landing of Ashanti troops in the late 19th century on Assin. He estimated that two ferries of boats crossed the River Pra with 12,000 men in five days with 30 men per boats and four trips an hour.  In a feature seldom seen among African armies, the Ashanti also deployed units of medical personnel behind the main forces, who were tasked with caring for the wounded and removing the dead. A full time medical corps was established as a branch of the Ashanti army by the late 19th century.

Mobilization, recruitment and logistics 
A small core of professional warriors was supplemented by peasant levies, volunteers and contingents from allied forces or tributary kingdoms. Grouped together under competent commanders such as Osei Tutu and Opoku Ware, such hosts began to expand the Ashanti empire in the 18th century on into the 19th, moving from deep inland to the edges of the Atlantic. One British source in 1820 estimated that the Ashanti could field into battle a potential 80,000 troops, and of these, 40,000 could in theory, be outfitted with muskets or blunder-busses.

Slaves marched behind the main body of the army, carrying supplies on their head. The army was also accompanied by carpenters responsible for building shelters, blacksmiths to repair weapons and sutlers to sell food and drink. Some wives followed their husbands to war where they cooked for them at camp and provided water during battle. For Thornton, the Great Roads played a role in Ashanti warfare. These roads allowed for the rapid deployment of the army and they negated the tactics of Ashanti's opponents who took advantage of the forest in their campaigns against the state.

Equipment

Arms 
Before the unification of the Ashanti clans as one kingdom and empire, the bow, shield and arrow were the weapon of choice. After the 1701 conquest of Denkyira, Osei Tutu I established trade contacts with European merchants at the coast through which he enabled the supply of firearms. The Ashanti became familiar with firearms in the 18th century. Majority of the Ashanti troops were armed with a variety of guns and this includes the standard European trade musket; Long Dane. Richards argues on Ashanti's success with long-barrelled muskets which he states to have brought a change in warfare around the hinterland of the Gold Coast in the 1740s. Around 1742,the Ashanti army defeated the Akyem with Dutch muskets whose barrels were 5–6 feet long in comparison with Akyem's short barrels 3–4 feel long. This victory led to the large demand for such kind of muskets in the region.

A handful of the Ashanti had modern breechloading British Snider–Enfield rifles. British reports from 1878–1881, estimated that the Ashanti had a total of 1000–5000 modern rifles. In addition, they employed 1000 well-worn French smoothbore muskets originally used in 1814 at the battle of Waterloo. However, Ashanti guns were obsolete compared to first rank European firearms. General Nkwanta, head of the Ashanti army's general council is reported to have done a detailed assessment of new breech-loading European firearms in 1872–73 and was alarmed by the obsolescence of Ashanti muskets in comparison to their European counterparts. Good quality powder was in short supply. Most of the gunmen did not use wadding to compact the powder down into the barrels but simply dumped in it while adding a variety of lead slugs, nails, bits of metal or even stones. This made an impressive pyrotechnic display but demanded opponents to be in close range. 

Available guns as well as pouches for ammunition were carefully protected with leopard or leather skin covers. Soldiers carried thirty to forty gunpowder charges within reach, which was individually packed in small wooden boxes for quick loading. The buckskin belt worn by the soldiers provided alternate weapons such as several types of knives and machete.

Artillery 
Ashanti king, Kwaku Dua signed a military agreement which involved the yearly supply of Ashanti troops to the Royal Netherlands East Indies Army in exchange for Dutch artillery pieces. The Dutch suppliers provided the Ashanti king with immobile cannons on ships rather than field carriages. There existed in Kumasi, a Cannon-square that housed a trophy of Dutch Cannons. They were captured from Denkyira after Ashanti emerged victorious at the Battle of Feyiase.

Attire 
Most fighters wore a batakari which was made out of materials including charms and amulets originally from Dagbon. The Ashanti believed these charms made them invulnerable. Bowdich described the ordinary soldier in the 19th century as;

He also described the appearance of the war captain in 1817 as follows;

Scholar Manu-Osafo argues that the myth over the invulnerability of the batakari to repel bullets was fueled by the poor accuracy of firearms during that period. In addition, the leather pouches and metal cases of the attire presented the war dress to be heavy, dense and impenetrable. Edgerton on the other hand, states that the Ashanti army did not have a single formal uniform for warfare as its forces dressed distinctively.

Battle tactics 
The Ashanti tactical system was decentralized in order to suit the thick forest terrain of West Africa. The growth of jungles often hindered large scale clashes involving thousands of soldiers in the open. Ashanti tactical methods involved smaller sub units, constant movement, sub movement, ambushes and more dispersed strikes and counter-attacks. 
In one unusual incident in 1741 however, the armies of Asante and Akyem agreed to schedule a battle while they jointly assigned some 10,000 men to cut down trees to make space for a full scale clash. The Ashanti won this encounter.

A British commentary in 1844 stated that Ashanti tactics involved cutting a number of footpaths in the bush in order to approach and encircle the enemy force. The Ashanti army formed in line and attacked the enemy upon reaching the initial jump-off point. Other British accounts describe the use of converging columns by the Ashanti army whereby several marching parallel columns joined into one general strike force, maneuvering before combat. The converging column strategy was used by Napoleon Bonaparte in the Napoleonic Wars as well as the British in their war with the Ashanti around 1873–4. The 'march divided, fight together' was the original raison d'etre of the division. These standardized tactics had often yielded the Ashanti victory. In battle, the Ashanti troops carried their guns exactly at the same angle, before they turned towards the enemy and fired volleys on command. Scouts screened the army of the enemy as it marched in its columns, then withdrew as the enemy became close. At the beginning of combat, the advance guard moved up in 2 or 3 long lines, discharged its muskets and paused to reload. The second line would then advance to fire and reload. A third rear line would then repeat the advance – fire-reload cycle. This "rolling fire" tactic was repeated until the advance halted. Flanking maneuvers also formed part of Ashanti tactics. Iliffe and Smith have commented that some Ashanti forces could fire from the shoulder. In 1820, Joseph Dupuis wrote that the Ashanti were "trained to firing with celerity as we ourselves use the musquet."

The Ashanti also used hammer and anvil tactics in wars such as the third Anglo-Ashanti war. In 1874 a strong British force under Sir Garnet Wolseley, armed with modern rifles and artillery, invaded the territory of the Ashanti Empire. The Ashanti did not confront the invaders immediately, and made no major effort to interdict their long, vulnerable lines of communication through the jungle terrain. Their plan appeared to be to draw the British deep into their territory, against a strong defensive anvil centred at the town of Amoaful. Here the British would be tied down, while maneuvering wing elements circled to the rear, trapping and cutting them off. Some historians (Farwell 2001) note that this was approach was a traditional Ashanti battle strategy, and was common in some African armies as well. At the village of Amoaful, the Ashanti succeeded in luring their opponents forward, but could not make any headway against the modern firepower of the British forces, which laid down a barrage of fire to accompany an advance of infantry in squares. This artillery fire took a heavy toll on the Ashanti, but they left a central blocking force in place around the village, while unleashing a large flanking attack on the left, that almost enveloped the British line and successfully broke into some of the infantry squares. Ashanti weaponry however, was poor compared to the modern British guns. As one participant noted:

"The Ashantees stood admirably, and kept up one of the heaviest fires I ever was under. While opposing our attack with immediately superior numbers, they kept enveloping our left with a constant series of well-directed flank attacks."

Wolesey had anticipated the Ashanti "horseshoe" formations, and had strengthened the British flanks with the best units and reinforced firepower. He was able to shift this firepower to threatened sectors to stymie enemy maneuvers, defeating their hammer and anvil elements and forcing his opponents to retreat. One British combat post-mortem pays tribute to the slain Ashanti commander for his tactical leadership and use of terrain:
"The great Chief Amanquatia was among the killed. Admirable skill was shown in the position selected by Amanquatia, and the determination and generalship he displayed in the defence fully bore out his great reputation as an able tactician and gallant soldier."

Siege and engineering 
In one siege of a British Fort during the Anglo-Ashanti wars, the Ashanti sniped at the defenders, cut the telegraph wires as a means of curbing communication, blocked food supplies, and attacked relief columns. The Ashanti Empire built powerful log stockades at key points. This was employed in later wars against the British to block British advances. Some of these fortifications were over a hundred yard long, with heavy parallel tree trunks. They were impervious to destruction by artillery fire. Behind these stockades, numerous Ashanti soldiers were mobilized to check enemy movement. While formidable in construction, many of these strongpoints failed because Ashanti guns, gunpowder and bullets provided little sustained killing power in defense. British troops overcame or bypassed the stockades by mounting bayonet charges, after laying down some covering fire. 

Brass barrel blunderbuss were produced in some states in the Gold Coast including the Ashanti Empire around the eighteenth and nineteenth centuries. Various accounts indicate that Asante blacksmiths were not only able to repair firearms, but that barrels, locks and stocks were on occasion remade. Besides the local production of guns, gunpowder may have been prepared in Ashanti.

See also 
 African military systems to 1800
 African military systems (1800–1900)
 African military systems after 1900
 Anglo-Ashanti wars
 Ashanti–Fante War
 Ga-Fante War
 Impi
 Katamanso War
 Political systems of the Ashanti Empire

References

Bibliography 
Basil, Davidson  African Civilization Revisited, Africa World Press: 1991 

C. Henry, Brackenbury The Ashanti War (1874) Volume 1: A Narrative, Andrews UK Limited: 2012 

 

 

1670 establishments in Africa
1902 disestablishments in Africa
Military history of Africa
History of the Ashanti Empire